Cephalization is an evolutionary trend in which, over many generations, the mouth, sense organs, and nerve ganglia become concentrated at the front end of an animal, producing a head region. This is associated with movement and bilateral symmetry, such that the animal has a definite head end. This led to the formation of a highly sophisticated brain in three groups of animals, namely the arthropods, cephalopod molluscs, and vertebrates.

Animals without bilateral symmetry

Cnidaria, such as the radially symmetrical Hydrozoa, show some degree of cephalization. The Anthomedusae have a head end with their mouth, photoreceptive cells, and a concentration of neural cells.

Bilateria

Cephalization is a characteristic feature of the Bilateria, a large group containing the majority of animal phyla. These have the ability to move, using muscles, and a body plan with a front end that encounters stimuli first as the animal moves forwards, and accordingly has evolved to contain many of the body's sense organs, able to detect light, chemicals, and gravity. There is often also a collection of nerve cells able to process the information from these sense organs, forming a brain in several phyla and one or more ganglia in others.

Acoela
The Acoela are basal bilaterians, part of the Xenacoelomorpha. They are small and simple animals, and have very slightly more nerve cells at the head end than elsewhere, not forming a distinct and compact brain. This represents an early stage in cephalization.

Flatworms

The Platyhelminthes (flatworms) have a more complex nervous system than the Acoela, and are lightly cephalized, for instance having an eyespot above the brain, near the front end.

Complex active bodies
The philosopher Michael Trestman noted that three bilaterian phyla, namely the arthropods, the molluscs in the shape of the cephalopods, and the chordates, were distinctive in having "complex active bodies", something that the acoels and flatworms did not have. Any such animal, whether predator or prey, has to be aware of its environment—to catch its prey, or to evade its predators. These groups are exactly those that are most highly cephalized. These groups, however, are not closely related: in fact, they represent widely separated branches of the Bilateria, as shown on the phylogenetic tree; their lineages split hundreds of  millions of years ago. Other (less cephalized) phyla are not shown, for clarity.

Arthropods

In arthropods, cephalization progressed with the gradual incorporation of trunk segments into the head region. This was advantageous because it allowed for the evolution of more effective mouth-parts for capturing and processing food. Insects are strongly cephalized, their brain made of three fused ganglia attached to the ventral nerve cord, which in turn has a pair of ganglia in each segment of the thorax and abdomen. The insect head is an elaborate structure made of several segments fused rigidly together, and equipped with both simple and compound eyes, and multiple appendages including sensory antennae and complex mouthparts (maxillae and mandibles).

Cephalopods

Cephalopod molluscs including octopus, squid, cuttlefish and nautilus are the most intelligent and highly cephalized invertebrates, with well-developed senses, including advanced 'camera' eyes and large brains.

Vertebrates

Cephalization in vertebrates, the group that includes mammals, birds, reptiles, amphibians and fishes, has been studied extensively. The heads of vertebrates are complex structures, with distinct sense organs (sight by camera-type eyes, olfaction by nostrils, taste by taste buds, balance & hearing by otic vesicle); a large, multi-lobed brain (three-part at least); and later,  in jawed ones, teeth and, in tetrapods, tongue (teeth like keratinous structures and tongue arose independently in jawless lampreys).Cephalochordates like Branchiostoma (the lancelet, a small fishlike animal with very little cephalization), are closely related to vertebrates but do not have these structures. In the 1980s, the new head hypothesis proposed that the vertebrate head is an evolutionary novelty resulting from the emergence of neural crest and cranial placodes (thickened areas of ectoderm), which result in the formation of all senses outside of the brain. However, in 2014, a transient larva tissue of the lancelet was found to be virtually indistinguishable from the neural crest-derived cartilage (later bone, in jawed ones) which forms the vertebrate skull, suggesting that persistence of this tissue and expansion into the entire head space could be a viable evolutionary route to formation of the vertebrate head. Advanced vertebrates have increasingly elaborate brains.

See also
 Noogenesis
 Organogenesis
 Phylogenetics

References

Evolutionary biology
Evolutionary biology terminology